Pat is a village located in the eastern part of  Zala County, Hungary, 25 kilometres from Nagykanizsa.

The neighbouring villages are Miháld and Varászló, which is now part of Somogy County. The county border is only 300 metres from the centre of Pat.

Population 
The nationality breakdown at the time of the 2011 census was as follows:

Hungarian 97,5%, german 2,5%.

63.6% of the inhabitants declared themselves Roman Catholic, 5.8% Reformed, 18.9% Evangelical (10.2% did not declare).

References

External links 
 Street map 

Populated places in Zala County